Prilep is a city in North Macedonia.

Prilep may also refer to:

 Lordship of Prilep, a successor-state of the Serbian Empire
 Prilep, Burgas Province, a village in the Burgas Province, Bulgaria
 Prilep, Dobrich Province, a village in the Dobrich Province, Bulgaria
 Prilep, Kosovo, a village in Kosovo
 Prilep Knoll, a hill in Graham Land, Antarctica
 Prilep Municipality, North Macedonia